The Hoax Is Over is an album by Australian blues-rock band, The Aztecs.

Background and recording 
Billy Thorpe, the leader of the Aztecs, renewed the band in late 1968. Guitarist Lobby Loyde joined the band, and they turned to a more bluesy, heavier style.

Release 
"The Hoax Is Over" was released in January 1971 by Infinity. All of four tracks of the album also released on the 3-CD compilation in 1994, but "Gangster of Love" and "Mississippi" (renamed to "Born in Mississippi") in a shortened version.

Track listing 
 "Gangster of Love"
 "Goodbye Baby"
 "Mississippi"
 "Truth"

Personnel 
 Billy Thorpe – vocals, harmonica, rhythm guitar
 Lobby Loyde – lead guitar
 Warren Morgan – keyboards
 Paul Wheeler – bass
 Kevin Murphy – drums

References 

1971 albums
Billy Thorpe and the Aztecs albums